Eagle Forum is a conservative interest group in the United States founded by Phyllis Schlafly in 1972 and is the parent organization that also includes the Eagle Forum Education and Legal Defense Fund and the Eagle Forum PAC. The Eagle Forum has been primarily focused on social issues; it describes itself as pro-family and reports membership of 80,000. Critics have described it as socially conservative and anti-feminist.

History

In 1967, Phyllis Schlafly launched the Eagle Trust Fund for receiving donations related to conservative causes. After the 1972 proposal of the Equal Rights Amendment (ERA), Schlafly reorganized her efforts to defeat its ratification, founding the group "Stop ERA"  and starting the Eagle Forum Newsletter. In 1975 Stop ERA was renamed the Eagle Forum.

The Eagle Forum Education and Legal Defense Fund was organized in 1981 as a non-profit wing of Eagle Forum. It is a tax deductible charity under Internal Revenue Service (IRS) code.

The Eagle Forum PAC began receiving donations in 1993 and has served as a source for candidate endorsements from the Eagle Forum and has donated money to various candidates that the organization People for the American Way has described as "right-wing".

In the mid-2000s, Eagle Forum, along with the John Birch Society, mobilized conservative opposition to a so-called North American Union and the Security and Prosperity Partnership of North America. As a result of two organizations' activities, 23 state legislatures saw bills introduced condemning an NAU while the Bush and Obama administrations were deterred “from any grand initiatives.”

Eagle Forum members have often worked within the Republican Party. The Texas state Eagle Forum chairperson, Cathie Adams, for instance, was named Republican national committeewoman from Texas at the state convention in 2008 and then in October 2009 was chosen as interim chairperson of the Republican Party of Texas.

After Schlafly's death, a dispute among Eagle Forum leaders resulted in court battles, with the organization eventually splitting into two.

Political and social positions 
The Eagle Forum is involved primarily in conservative issues. The organization uses grassroots techniques to promote conservative women's and family issues in public policy.

According to the organization's website, the Eagle Forum's mission is "to enable conservative and pro-family men and women to participate in the process of self-government and public policy making so that America will continue to be a land of individual liberty, respect for family integrity, public and private virtue, and private enterprise." On its website, the Eagle Forum states its invitation to "build a better educated, safer, stronger America based on traditional values." It outlines its five missions as an organization: supporting American sovereignty, supporting American identity, supporting the Constitution, exposing radical feminists, and supporting a traditional education.

The organization is composed of strong advocates of border security, and is against international oversight from the United Nations and the International Criminal Court. In 2006, Eagle Forum began preparations to fight the supposed introduction of the Amero Northern American currency.

The Eagle Forum supports English-only education in schools, saying that every child should be taught to read and write in English before first grade. The organization opposes "liberal propaganda" in schools, and supports parents' right to protect their children against such information. It has also opposed access to free daycare, as well as sex education in general.

The Eagle Forum was pegged by Schlafly as "the alternative to women's lib". It is opposed to a number of feminist issues, which founder Phyllis Schlafly claimed were "extremely destructive" and "poisoned the attitudes of many young women." The organization believes only in a family consisting of a father, mother and children. They are supportive of women's right to choose to be "fulltime homemakers", and oppose same-sex marriage. Eagle Forum opposes abortion and has defended the push for government defunding of Planned Parenthood.

Opposition to the ERA 

After gaining publicity for her book, A Choice, Not an Echo, Phyllis Schlafly began her fight against the ratification of the proposed Equal Rights Amendment (ERA). The ERA had passed in the United States House of Representatives by a vote of 354 to 23. Five months later, the amendment passed in the Senate with a vote of 84 to 8, and 7 members abstaining. In order to be adopted into the Constitution, the amendment had to be ratified by three-fourths (38) of the states. Schlafly then reorganized her efforts to defeat its ratification, founding the group "STOP ERA" and starting the Eagle Forum Newsletter. STOP ERA was established in the fall of 1972 an organization dedicated to the defeat of the Equal Rights Amendment. The group's name is an acronym for the phrase "Stop Taking Our Privileges".

In one issue of the Eagle Forum Newsletter, titled "Whats Wrong With Equal Rights for Women", Schlafly argued against the ratification of the ERA on the basis that it would take rights and protections away from women. According to Schlafly, the passage of the ERA could "mean Government-funded abortions, homosexual schoolteachers, women forced into military combat and men refusing to support their wives." The newsletter began to circulate, and many conservative women wrote to their legislators, relaying the concerns voiced by Schlafly in the Eagle Forum Newsletter. Support for The Eagle Forum grew with the support of many conservative women and various church groups, as did the opposition to the ERA. Many of the same women who had helped Schlafly distribute her book were involved with STOP ERA. Less than a year after its creation, STOP ERA had grown to several thousand members.

State legislators were able to vote on the ERA beginning in March 1972 and were given a deadline in 1979. Within a year, thirty states had ratified the ERA, and the amendment needed only eight more states to pass. In 1977, STOP ERA protested the Equal Rights Amendment at the 1977 National Women's Conference in Houston, Texas. STOP ERA claimed that the national plan of action that was proposed at the conference was “anti-family". At the conference, Phyllis Schlafly teamed up with Indiana State Senator Joan Gubbins to form a "pro-life, pro-family" coalition to voice the conservative opposition to the ERA. Schlafly also testified against the potentially harmful effects of the ERA before Georgia, Virginia, Missouri, and Arkansas legislatures. STOP ERA's tactics were successful; by the 1979 deadline the amendment still needed three states to pass.  The ERA was then given a three-year extension, during which no states ratified or rescinded the amendment. By the time of the ERA's defeat, the Eagle Forum had reached 50,000 members.

Since its initial defeat, the Equal Rights Amendment has been revisited by legislators, such as Carolyn Maloney.  In March 2021, a United States Federal court ruled that the window of time to ratify the ERA had expired and recent efforts by Nevada, Illinois and Virginia to support ratification are "too late to count".

Programs and activities 
Two youth-oriented programs are also operated by the Forum: the "Teen Eagles" program for children ages 13–19, and the "Eagle Forum Collegians" for conservative-minded college students.

See also

 Women in conservatism in the United States
 Concerned Women for America
 Conservapedia, a wiki-based encyclopedia project launched by Schlafly's son
 Elaine Donnelly (writer)
 Gayle Ruzicka

References

External links
 

 
Political organizations based in the United States
Legal advocacy organizations in the United States
Non-profit organizations based in Illinois
Criticism of feminism
Conservative organizations in the United States
Organizations established in 1967
Anti-abortion organizations in the United States
Equal Rights Amendment